Longton is one of the six towns which amalgamated to form the county borough of Stoke-on-Trent in 1910, along with Hanley, Tunstall, Fenton, Burslem and Stoke-upon-Trent. It is in the ceremonial county of Staffordshire, England

History
Longton ('long village') was a market town in the parish of Stoke in the county of Staffordshire. The town still has a market housed in an attractively renovated market hall.

Coal miners in the Hanley and Longton area ignited the 1842 general strike and associated Pottery Riots.

In March 1865, Longton and Lane End were incorporated as the Borough of Longton. On 1 April 1910, the town was federated into the county borough of Stoke-on-Trent.

Arnold Bennett referred to Longton as Longshaw, one of the "five towns" featured in his novels set in the Staffordshire Potteries.

Industry
The district has a long history as a base for the pottery industry, such as Paragon China and Aynsley, and several major manufacturers still have a presence, along with Gladstone Pottery Museum. Roslyn Works, which adjoins the latter, is now home to several small-scale manufacturers of ceramics.

Florence colliery, which opened in the 19th century, was one of the pits of the North Staffordshire Coalfield. It was connected underground to another pit at Hem Heath.  It was closed in the 1990s.

Landmarks

Public buildings
Longton Town Hall, which was completed in 1844 and was the local seat of government until 1910, was being stripped out by contractors when it was saved from demolition in 1986.

Industrial buildings

There are fewer than 50 surviving bottle ovens in the city of Stoke-on-Trent (and only a scattering elsewhere in the UK). The kilns of the Gladstone Pottery Museum, along with others in the Longton conservation area represent a significant proportion of the national stock of the structures. The bottle ovens of Longton have been promoted as a tourist attraction.
In the 21st century, the condition of some of the bottle ovens has given cause for concern. A Stoke-on-Trent Ceramic Heritage Action Zone was created with the double function of regenerating Longton and surviving bottle ovens throughout the city.

Transport
In 1997 Longton's one-way system was bypassed when a new section of the A50 was opened. It runs from Blythe Bridge to Queensway (a section of the A500), going through Longton in a cutting. 

Longton is served by a railway station on the Crewe–Derby line. It was opened by the North Staffordshire Railway on 7 August 1848. A new bus interchange was opened adjacent to it in 2003 on the site of a former Co-op supermarket.

Education
Secondary schools in the area include St Thomas More Catholic Academy and Stoke Studio College.

Together with Rochdale, then in Lancashire, Longton was host to the first Workers' Educational Association tutorial classes. R. H. Tawney, known as "the patron saint of adult education", taught the classes for three years starting in January 1908.

Retail
A new shopping precinct, the Bennett Precinct, opened in 1962. It is now named Longton Exchange.

In 2003 a Tesco Extra hypermarket was built (there are other Tesco stores at Meir). Since then, other major retailers such as Argos, Next, Pizza Hut, Matalan, Wilko and B & M have opened new premises.

Building firm St. Modwen's opened an £8 million retail complex in April 2012. The stores there include McDonald's, Pets at Home, Smyths and Currys.

Other local businesses like Hylands and Bevans have also thrived in the area.

Nightlife
Jollees Cabaret Club was a very popular nightspot in the 1970s, attracting some of the biggest names in entertainment. In the early 1990s, Shelley's Laserdome became widely known throughout the Midlands as a rave venue, but it was forced to close in 1992.

Notable people

 Sir John Edensor Heathcote (c.1757–1822) Stoke-on-Trent industrialist, owner of Longton Hall, which he rebuilt in 1778.
 John Aynsley (1823–1907) English potter who established the Portland Works in Longton
 Percy Shelley (1860-1937) was a major force in developing Shelley Potteries, born in Longton.
 Frederick Arthur Challinor (1866–1952), was a British composer.
 Ernest Albert Egerton  (1897–1966) English recipient of the Victoria Cross
 William Thomas Astbury  (1898–1961) English physicist and molecular biologist who made pioneering X-ray diffraction studies of biological molecules.
 Gordon Mons Higginson (1918-1993) British purported spiritualist medium.
 Charles Tomlinson (1927–2015) English poet, attended Longton High School
 Freddie Jones (1927–2019) actor; his many roles on film and television included Sandy Thomas in Emmerdale.
 Andrew Evans (born 1950s) a soldier from Longton, stationed at Whittington Barracks, was wrongfully convicted and served 25 years in custody after confessing to the 1972 murder of Judith Roberts, a 14-year-old schoolgirl from Tamworth.

Sport 
 William (Billy) Weston (1847-1935) Australasian billiards player, emigrated from Longton aged 3.
 George Arthur Gallimore (1886–1949) English professional footballer who made 77 appearances for Stoke City F.C.
 Henry "Harry" Colclough (1888–1955) English international footballer, who made 83 appearances for Crystal Palace F.C.
 William Wootton (1904–2000) English footballer, made 56 appearances for Port Vale F.C.
 Norman Henry Hallam (1920–1997) was an English footballer, made 63 appearances for Port Vale F.C.
 Philip Adrian "Phil" Heath (born 1964) former professional English footballer, made 297 appearances.

Trivia
 Longton is the birthplace and home of Alan Povey's character Owd Grandad Piggott
 Black Country folk singer/songwriter, Neil Morris, now lives near Longton

Gallery

References

External links
Make it Stoke-on-Trent – Longton Regeneration (listings of local amenities and regeneration projects)
Longton – Stoke-on-Trent
Longton
Gladstone Pottery Museum
Use interactive maps to find historic photographs and artefacts of old Longton
Town profile at The Sentinel (local newspaper)
Longton South Community Blog (local blog)
 www.hylands.tv

Areas of Stoke-on-Trent
Towns in Staffordshire
Former civil parishes in Staffordshire